The College of Saint Benilde Blazers are the NCAA senior varsity team of De La Salle–College of Saint Benilde.

The Blazers were formerly a member National Capital Region Athletic Association (NCRAA) before they applied and were admitted to the NCAA in 1998. They then went on to win their first NCAA seniors basketball title in 2000 was the fastest for an expansion squad.

The other senior varsity teams may also be referred to as the Blazers. The juniors team are the CSB–LSGH Junior Blazers (officially the CSB–LSGH Greenies) of La Salle Green Hills, while the women's teams (volleyball and taekwondo) are the St. Benilde Lady Blazers.

Almost all sports program of the Blazers excel in their events, leading to the De La Salle-College of Saint Benilde winning its first General Championship honors in NCAA Season 81, and again in NCAA Season 83, NCAA Season 84, NCAA Season 89, and NCAA Season 90.

Name
As homage to the school which introduced several pioneering courses in the country, the college adopted the BLAZERS as their moniker. It is a short term for Trail Blazers, which emphasizes the college's commitment to set a standard for innovative quality education as well as sports development.

With the La Salle Green Hills Greenies

When De La Salle University selected De La Salle Santiago Zobel School as its junior affiliate team when it entered the UAAP in 1986, La Salle Green Hills was left without membership in either the UAAP or the NCAA, thus starting a 17-year drought in a major collegiate league since its formal withdrawal from the NCAA in 1981.

De La Salle–College of Saint Benilde, a member school of the De La Salle University System, applied for admission to the NCAA through the efforts of the System President Br. Andrew Gonzalez, FSC, the Greenies were selected as the junior team by then LSGH President Br. Bernard Oca FSC. Both De La Salle-College of Saint Benilde and La Salle Green Hills were admitted to the NCAA in 1998.

The La Salle Greenies (officially the CSB–LSGH Junior Blazers in the NCAA) is the junior affiliate team of the St. Benilde Blazers. Since DLS–CSB is not directly connected with its high school affiliate, except that they are both administered by the Lasallian Christian Brothers, LSGH labels "St. Benilde" instead of "La Salle" on their jerseys.

The Blazers' senior varsity uniforms added the initials 'LSGH' in their uniforms, starting with Season 89, and during games, the CSB Green Pepper Squad began to distribute clappers with 'La Salle' written on them. These were done to further connect both schools and their Lasallian roots.

In addition, beginning with Season 86, the Blazers replaced black with green as their primary uniform color, in time for the centennial anniversary of Lasallian education in the Philippines. Black remains an accent color.

With De La Salle Zobel in WNCAA 

In contrast to their men's junior counterparts, DLSZ represents College of St. Benilde in the WNCAA since the NCAA didn't have women's basketball in their scheme.

The De La Salle Lady Junior Archers have been the WNCAA Junior Division Champions for eight straight years, from 1993 to 2000 and again in 2004.

Saint Benilde - San Sebastian Rivalry

This short-lived rivalry sparked when DLS-CSB, who joined only in 1998, met San Sebastian College–Recoletos (or simply Baste) in the finals of 2000, and 2002. CSB won in the Finals of 2000, bannered by what is dubbed as the best CSB Blazers team ever assembled. With former NCAA MVP Sunday Salvacion, Jondan Salvador, and Al Magpayo, the Blazers beat the formidable San Sebastian Stags and won their first NCAA seniors basketball championship title, despite joining the league a season earlier. This marks the fastest win for any new school in the league since WWII.

However, the Stags avenged their defeat and defeated the Blazers in the Finals of 2002. The Golden Stags, led by graduating players Christian Coronel, Nurjanjam Alfad, Paul Reguerra, Roy Falcasantos, and Bernardo Mercado, swept the Blazers, 2–0. Mercado later joined the SSC-R's coaching staff as an assistant coach. Leomar Najorda was adjudged as the 2002 NCAA Finals MVP.

NCAA General Champions
As of 2015, the CSB Blazers earned five General Championships, winning three of these in a span of four years, being runners-up to PCU in the 2006–07 season. They won double championships with LSGH in NCAA Season 83 (2007–08 season) and NCAA Season 84 (2008–09 season). The Blazers won more Seniors General Championship in NCAA Season 89 (2013–14 season) and NCAA Season 90 (2014-15 season).

Their junior counterparts, LSGH, won two General Championships as De La Salle College and the other eight General Championship as LSGH. As the DLS–CSB juniors team, LSGH won four General Championships.

NCAA Season 82 Hosting

De La Salle–College of Saint Benilde served hosting rights for the first time in 2006–2007 season of the NCAA, with the theme "Proud and True at 82: Blazing Beyond Limits." Under the leadership of the Sports and Development Office (SDO), the Benildean community flocked to fill the Araneta Coliseum at opening day. The number of Benildeans in the arena was only rivaled by that of the NCAA 2000 finals, as the Dome was rocked by chants of "Animo Benilde!".

The College again hosted the NCAA after one rotation, in Season 89 (2013).

Blazie, the official mascot of the 82nd NCAA season, was created by DLS-CSB Multimedia Arts Student and Marketing Communications Office (MCO) student staff Charmaine Collen Hao.

CSB pep squad and NCAA cheerleading competition
The De La Salle-College of Saint Benilde's pep squad has been officially known as the CSB Green Peppers (from 2005) and then later on as the CSB Pep Squad (since 2007).

Since the inception of the event, the CSB Pep Squad has always placed last (7th) from 2004 and 2005, were suspended by the school in 2006, 6th in 2007, and then placed their highest rank ever as second runner-up in 2008.

Select members of the CSB pep squad, along with the DLSU, LSGH and DLSZ pep squads, performed together at halftime of Game 1 of the La Salle-Ateneo UAAP Finals on September 18, 2008, in commemoration of Saint Benilde's 20th anniversary, De La Salle Zobel's 30th anniversary, and the incoming 100th anniversary of the De La Salle schools in the Philippines in 2011.

Basketball

Notable players
 Sunday Salvacion - 1999 NCAA Rookie of the Year, 2002 NCAA Mythical Five Selection and Most Valuable Player
 Alejandro Magpayo - 2000 NCAA Rookie of the Year, 2003 NCAA Mythical Five Selection and Defensive Player of the Year
 Mark Magsumbol - 2000 NCAA Finals Most Valuable Player
 Jondan Salvador - 2001 NCAA Mythical Five Selection
 Ernie Jay Sagad - 2004 NCAA Mythical Five Selection, 2005 NCAA Most Valuable Player
 Lou Gatumbato - Played with Air21 Express and Barako Bull Energy
 Ron Capati - Played with Coca-Cola Tigers and Saigon Heat
 Estilitus Mendoza - 2000 NCAA Champion
 Carlo Lastimosa - current NLEX Road Warriors player.
 David Licauco - Kapuso teen actor

Coaches
 Adriano "Bong" Go (1998–2000)
 Dong Vergeire (2000–03)
 Tonichi Yturri (2003–05)
 Caloy Garcia (2005–07)
 Gee Abanilla (2008–09, on leave for the 2009 season and former head coach of the De La Salle Green Archers during the 2012–13 season)
 Richard del Rosario (2009–2013)
 Gabby Velasco (2013–2016)
 TY Tang (2017–2021, former PBA player and member of the De La Salle Green Archers team that won the championship in 2007)
 Charles Tiu (2021–present)

WNCAA Senior Division Women's Basketball 
The 1997 line-up of the Lady Blazers basketball team holds the honor of giving College of Saint Benilde its very first championship in women's basketball by beating rival Lyceum College on October 12, 1997. The following year, they were crowned WNCAA's back-to-back champions.

Notable players
 Jean Cruz- 2016 Women's PBA 3x3, Played with Blackwater
Coaches
Antonio "Tatang" Mendoza (1994–1996)
Cholo Martin (1996-1997)
Angelina "Piao" Fedilliaga  (1998–2009)

Volleyball

On January 28, 2016, the CSB Lady Blazers women's volleyball team claimed their first NCAA women's volleyball championship since they joined the league in 1998 after beating the thrice-to-beat San Sebastian Lady Stags in 4th sets on the do-or-die Game 4 of the Season 91 finals series.

Women's volleyball roster
 NCAA Season 98 

Coaching staff
 Head coach: Rogelio Getigan
 Assistant coach:

 NCAA Season 95

Coaching staff
 Head coach: Jerry Yee
 Assistant coach:Jose Roque
 Former head coach: Michael "Macky" Cariño
 Former head coach:Jerry Yee

Men's volleyball roster
 NCAA Season 93 

 Head Coach: Arnold Laniog

Junior's volleyball roster
 NCAA Season 91

Beach volleyball
 NCAA Season 93
Men's
 Jan Arianne Daguil
 Melanie G. Torres
 Maritess C. Pablo

Men's
 Issah O'Neal S. Arda
 Ruvince O. Abrot
 Owen O. Bacani

Juniors
 Raymund Marc Cadevida
 Carlos Xavier Delos Reyes
 Vittorio Panaguiton, Jr.

References

National Collegiate Athletic Association (Philippines) teams
Former Philippine Basketball League teams
College sports teams in Metro Manila
Spikers' Turf
De La Salle–College of Saint Benilde